The 2017 Portland Timbers season is the 31st season in their existence and the 7th season for the Portland Timbers in Major League Soccer (MLS), the top-flight professional soccer league in the United States and Canada.  The season covers the period from November 16, 2016 to the end of MLS Cup Playoffs.

Background

Season review

Off season

On November 16, 2016, the Portland Timbers announced former player Ned Grabavoy as Director of Scouting and Recruitment.

On November 17, 2016, the Portland Timbers announced former player Jack Jewsbury as Director of Business Development.

On December 1, 2016, the Portland Timbers announced their schedule for the Desert Friendlies and Home Preseason Tournament.

On December 12, 2016, the Portland Timbers announced their first roster moves for the off season by exercising options on Zarek Valentin and Ben Zemanski and declining options on Nick Besler, Neco Brett, Wade Hamilton, Chris Klute, Chris Konopka, Ben Polk, Jermaine Taylor and Andy Thoma.

On December 15, 2016, the Portland Timbers and Steven Taylor mutually agreed to part ways.

On December 20, 2016, the Portland Timbers signed goalkeeper Jeff Attinella from Minnesota United FC.

On December 21, 2016, MLS announced the home opener for each team, having the Portland Timbers host Minnesota United FC as the first match of the league for the 2017 season.

On December 22, 2016, the Portland Timbers signed Costa Rican defensive midfielder David Guzmán from Deportivo Saprissa.

On January 4, 2017, the Portland Timbers signed Costa Rican defender Roy Miller from Deportivo Saprissa.

On January 9, 2017, the Portland Timbers loaned out Lucas Melano to Argentinian side, Club Atlético Belgrano.

On January 12, 2017, the Portland Timbers signed Portland Timbers 2 players Victor Arboleda, Rennico Clarke, and Kendall McIntosh.  The Timbers also re-signed Jack Barmby.  Hours later, the full 2017 schedule was released.

On January 13, 2017, the Portland Timbers selected Jeremy Ebobisse in the first round as the 4th pick overall in the 2017 MLS SuperDraft.  Portland later selected Michael Amick in the second round.

On January 17, 2017, the Portland Timbers selected Russell Cicerone and Romilio Hernandez in the fourth and final round of the 2017 MLS SuperDraft.

Preseason

On January 23, 2017, the Portland Timbers signed free-agent defender Chance Myers.  Dairon Asprilla returned to the club from his loan with Millonarios F.C. The Timbers also announced that they had re-signed defender/midfielder Amobi Okugo.

The Timbers began their first match of the preseason on January 27, 2017, taking on New York Red Bull in Tucson, Arizona.  Caleb Porter announced that he would be playing 3 groups, each changing at 30 minutes to give all the players time on the pitch.  In the 4th minute, Rennico Clarke would unfortunately send the ball into the Timber's own neat putting New York up 1–0.  In the 60th minute, Vincent Bezecourt would be awarded a penalty and would successfully convert it.  New York would end up winning with a final score of 0–2.

On January 31, 2017, the Portland Timbers took on Croatian First Division side NK Istra 1961.  The Timbers gave up another early goal, this time by Mitrevski in the 5th minute.  Portland would soon answer back from a successfully converted penalty from Fanendo Adi in the 16th minute.  In the second half, NK Istra would take the lead once again with a goal from Burić in the 75th minute.  The Timbers would shortly answer back with a goal from trialist Ordain in the 80th minute with an assist from Ben Zemanski.  NK Istra would finally take the lead and win it with penalty taken by Prelčec with a final score of 3–2.

On February 2, 2017, the Portland Timbers signed winger Sebastián Blanco from San Lorenzo as a Designated Player.  The Timbers also paid $75,000 to Seattle Sounders FC in General Allocation Money for his rights.

On February 3, 2017, the Portland Timbers signed Lawrence Olum from Sporting Kansas City and Nat Borchers announced his retirement from soccer.

On February 4, 2017, the Portland Timbers played their final match for the Desert Friendlies, taking on their main rivals, the Seattle Sounders.  The Timbers would strike first with a goal from Fanendo Adi, assisted by Diego Valeri in the 16th minute.  During the second half, Seattle would answer back with a successful converted penalty by Harry Shipp in the 71st minute.  Both teams would settle for a draw with a final score of 1–1.

On February 9, 2017, the Portland Timbers opened their home preseason tournament against Real Salt Lake.  Diego Valeri would score first in the 35th minute.  Diego Chará would be sent off in the 42nd minute from an elbow to the face foul after the referee used the new experimental replay system that is being used in MLS preseason.  Shortly after in the 43rd minute, Joao Plata would score a goal from a free kick due to Chará's foul.  In the 45th minute Valeri was awarded a penalty and successfully converted it.  Darren Mattocks would put the Timbers ahead with a goal, assisted by Jack Barmby, in the 51st minute.  Omar Holness would equalize Real Salt Lake with a goal in the 66th minute.  The final score would be a draw at 3–3.

On February 12, 2017, the Portland Timbers continued their preseason tournament by taking on one of the newest MLS expansion clubs, Minnesota United FC.  In the first half, Minnesota would prove to break through first with two goals from Johan Venegas in the 25th and 32nd minutes.  During the 2nd half, Jack McInerney would send the ball in the back of the net in the 51st to cut the lead in half.  Finally in the 84th minute Fanendo Adi would score a cheeky back heel goal, assisted by Alvas Powell and Sebastián Blanco to equalize the Timbers.  The final would be 2–2.

On February 15, 2017, Portland finished off their preseason tournament against their northern rival, Vancouver Whitecaps FC.  Diego Valeri would score first in the 26th minute with an assist from Darlington Nagbe and Vytas.  Shortly after in the 28th minute, Fanendo Adi would give Portland another goal, also with the assist from Nagbe and Vytas.  Cristian Techera would be the loan scorer for Vancouver in the 79th minute, giving Portland their first preseason victory of the 2017 season.  The Timbers also sold the rights of Rodney Wallace to New York City FC for $50,000 in General Allocation Money and $75,000 in Targeted Allocation Money.

On February 25, 2017, the Portland Timbers traveled to Carson, California to play their final preseason match for 2017 against LA Galaxy.  Fanendo Adi would receive a brace with the first goal in the 29th minute, assisted by Diego Valeri and David Guzmán.  The second in the 56th minute, assisted by Valeri.  Daniel Steres would be the loan goal scorer for LA, giving Portland their first preseason road victory with a final score of 2–1.

On March 1, 2017, the Portland Timbers waived forward Jack McInerney.

March
On March 3, the Timbers opened the 2017 MLS Season at home against new expansion side, Minnesota United FC.  The Timbers Army sung the national anthem as tradition since the first MLS match, then raised a Bob Ross "Happy Little Trees" themed tifo.  Timber's new center back Lawrence Olum would score the first goal of the season, assisted by Vytas and Diego Valeri in the 14th minute.  Shortly after the start of the 2nd half, Valeri would score in the 47th minute, assisted by their newly acquired Designated Player, Sebastián Blanco. Christian Ramirez, assisted by Johan Venegas, gave Minnesota United FC their first goal in Major League Soccer history.  In the 82nd minute, the Timbers were awarded a penalty and it was successfully converted by Valeri in the 82nd minute. Fanendo Adi would finish it up with goals in extra time.  The first in the 90+1 minute with an assist from Darlington Nagbe.  The final goal would come in the 90+3 minute.  The Timbers would start the season off strong with 3 points and a +4 goal differential, currently putting them first on the overall table after winning 5–1. It would stand as their strongest home opening win since starting MLS.

On March 12, Portland traveled to Carson, California for their first road match of the season to take on LA Galaxy.  The Timbers would start off strong with a counterattack goal from Diego Chará, with an assist from Diego Valeri in the 8th minute.  LA's Jelle Van Damme would receive two yellows, one in the 31st minute and another in the 35th, sending him off and putting LA at 10 men.  The Timbers would hold strong until the end and secure 3 points and their first league road win in over a year.

On March 18, Portland hosted the undefeated Houston Dynamo.  Before the match the Timbers paid tribute to Nat Borchers where he said his goodbye speech.  Shortly after, the Timbers Army raised their "Show racism the red card tifo" with the Portlandia statue with the Statue of Liberty crown.  The Timbers would be awarded an early penalty kick from a DaMarcus Beasley handball.  Diego Valeri would take and successfully convert it in the 11th minute, putting Portland up 1–0.  In the 37th minute, Houston would be awarded a penalty from a Diego Chara handball.  The shot was taken and successfully converted by Erick Torres in the 38th minute.  Just before the end of the 1st half, Houston would get another goal, from Romell Quioto, assisted by Alberth Elis in the 45+2 minute of stoppage time.  In the 58th minute, the Timbers would bounce back to equalize the match with a header from Valeri, assisted by Zarek Valentin and Fanendo Adi.  In the 66th minute, the Timbers would take control of the match with a goal from David Guzmán from an fantastic pass from Darlington Nagbe who would later be credited for an assist.  Finally in the 88th minute, the Timbers would secure the win with a goal from Adi, assisted by Guzmán.  The Timbers would continue their win streak with a 4–2 victory making a total 9 points (+7 goal differential) and currently hold first place overall for the 3rd consecutive week.

On March 25, Portland traveled to Columbus to take on Columbus Crew SC.  They would be without Darlinton Nagbe and David Guzmán, both of which are currently on international duty.  The Timbers would score early in the 4th minute from a goal from Dairon Asprilla, assisted by winger, Sebastián Blanco.  Columbus would shortly take control of the match with a goal from Justin Meram in the 11th minute and a goal from Ola Kamara, assisted by Federico Higuaín in the 19th minute.  3 Minutes into first half stoppage time, Fanendo Adi, assisted by Alvas Powell, would find the back of the net, leveling the match 2–2 at the half.  The Crew delivered the final blow with a goal from Niko Hansen in the 84th minute, ending the Timber's perfect win streak with a final score of 2–3.

Position at the end of March

April
Portland began the month of April by hosting the New England Revolution.  In the 12th minute, Diego Valeri would put the Timbers up my sending a misguided header from Chris Tierney and sending it to the top left corner of the net.  New England would be able to steal away Portland's victory with rebounded shot from Lee Nguyen in the 84th minute.  The Timbers would finish the match 1–1 and still in control of 1st place overall.

Position at the end of April

May
The Timbers traveled to San Jose to take on the Earthquakes for the start of May.  Still without Diego Valeri and now Darlington Nagbe announced out due to injury.  The Timbers would fall 0–3 for their current worst loss of the season with Chris Wondolowski clutching a brace.

On May 14, the Timbers hosted the Eastern Conference expansion side, Atlanta United FC.  Atlanta would score first shortly into the 2nd half.  In the 46th minute, Julian Gressel, assisted by Jeff Larentowicz, would send the ball past Jake Gleeson a few yards into the box.  Portland would respond in the 50th minute with a header goal from Liam Ridgewell taken from a long free kick by David Guzmán.  Both teams would end settle for a point with a final score of 1–1.

On May 20, Portland traveled to Montreal to take on the Impact.  Darlington Nagbe would make his return from injury and be in the starting lineup, making all of Portland's starters healthy once again.  In the 13th minute, Montreal would be awarded a penalty from an arguable grab from Sebastián Blanco.  Ignacio Piatti would take and convert the penalty.  In the 18th minute, Diego Chará would receive a straight red from an elbow to the face of Miguel Almirón.  This would be Portland's first red card of the season.  In the 33rd minute, Blerim Dzemaili would send a howler from distance to be punched away by Jake Gleeson.  In the 43rd minute, Kyle Fisher would send high header past Gleeson from a corner kick taken by Dzemaili.  In the 45th+1 minute, Diego Valeri would head the ball to the back of the net with an assist from Alvas Powell.  In the 50th minute, Piatti received the ball from Anthony Jackson-Hamel and charged through the Portland defense to score from just outside the box.  In the 77th minute, Ballou Jean-Yves Tabla would pass the ball to the other side of the box to Ambroise Oyongo who would finish off the match with the final goal.  The Timbers would fall 4–1 and have Chará suspended for their Cascadia rivalry match against Seattle Sounders FC.

Position as of May 20

Competitions

Competitions overview
{| class="wikitable" style="text-align: center"
|-
!rowspan=2|Competition
!colspan=8|Record
!Start Round
!First Match
!Last Match
!Final Position (Conference)
|-
!
!
!
!
!
!
!
!
!colspan=4|
|-
| Major League Soccer *

|1
|March 3, 2017
|October 22, 2017
|1st Place
|-
| MLS Cup Playoffs

|Semifinals
|October 30, 2017
|November 5, 2017
|Eliminated
|-
| U.S. Open Cup

|4th Round
|June 13, 2017
|June 13, 2017
|4th Round
|-
| Cascadia Cup *

|8
|April 22, 2017
|October 22, 2017
|1st Place
|-
! Total

!colspan=4|

* Major League Soccer and Cascadia Cup are all part of MLS regular season league play.  As a result, only Major League Soccer portion is included in the total.

Major League Soccer

Preseason

Desert friendlies

Rose City Invitational

Los Angeles (friendly)

MLS regular season

Western Conference table at end of season

Overall standings

Matches

The 2017 MLS regular-season schedule was released on January 12, 2017.

Results by round

Results by location

MLS Cup Playoffs

Houston Dynamo won 2–1 on aggregate.

U.S. Open Cup

Cascadia Cup

The Cascadia Cup is a trophy that was created in 2004 by supporters of the Portland Timbers, Seattle Sounders FC and Vancouver Whitecaps FC. It is awarded to the club with the best record in MLS regular-season games versus the other participants.

Table

Matches

Friendlies

Club

Executive staff

Coaching staff

Stadiums

Kits
Kits are used for a period of two years.  Afterwards, a new kit is released.  The year for each kit is offset so that one of the two changes each year.  The secondary kit is due to change at the end of this year.

Primary kit
The 2017 primary kit was unveiled on January 11, 2017. It features similar color styles as the 2014–2015 third kit, featuring a darker green and darker yellow colors.

Secondary kit
The secondary kit will be used from 2016 until the end of the 2017 season.  It features a red fading to black hoop style with each fade's border being the shape of thorns which represents Portland's nickname, the Rose City.  The kit however is not full hoops, the back is a solid red where the player's  name and number are featured.  The kit also has an alternative Alaska Airlines logo, however, with "Airlines" in small font below the logo.

Squad information

First-team squad
All players contracted to the club during the season included.
Last updated: September 13, 2017

 (HG) = Homegrown Player
 (GA) = Generation Adidas Player
 (DP) = Designated Player
 (INT) = Player using International Roster Slot
 (Loan) = On Loan
 (Loaned) = Loaned out to another club

Second team squad

Player/Staff Transactions

Transfers in

Loans in

Loans out

Transfers out

Contract extensions

Player's rights purchased

Player's rights sold

2016 MLS Re-Entry Draft Picks

2017 MLS SuperDraft Picks

Any player marked with a * is part of the Generation Adidas program.

Staff in

Staff Contract Extensions

Staff out

National Team participation 
Four Timbers player have been called up to play for their national teams during this season.

Honors and awards

MLS Player of the Week

MLS Goal of the Week

MLS Save of the Week

Statistics

Appearances

Goalkeeper stats
The list is sorted by total minutes played then by jersey number.

Line-up

Top scorers
The list is sorted by shirt number when total goals are equal.

Top assists
The list is sorted by shirt number when total assists are equal.

Clean sheets
The list is sorted by shirt number when total clean sheets are equal.

Summary

References

Portland Timbers
Portland Timbers
Portland Timbers
2017
Port